Advances in Mathematics is a peer-reviewed scientific journal covering research on pure mathematics. It was established in 1961 by Gian-Carlo Rota. The journal publishes 18 issues each year, in three volumes.

At the origin, the journal aimed at publishing articles addressed to a broader "mathematical community", and not only to mathematicians in the author's field. Herbert Busemann writes, in the preface of the first issue, "The need for expository articles addressing either all mathematicians or only those in somewhat related fields has long been felt, but little has been done outside of the USSR. The serial publication Advances in Mathematics was created in response to this demand."

Abstracting and indexing 
The journal is abstracted and indexed in:
CompuMath Citation Index
Current Contents/Physical, Chemical & Earth Sciences
Mathematical Reviews
Science Citation Index
Scopus 
Zentralblatt MATH

See also
List of periodicals published by Elsevier

References

External links

Mathematics journals
Publications established in 1961
English-language journals
Elsevier academic journals
Hybrid open access journals